Top 100 Egyptian films (aliases: CIFF 100 Egyptian films or Greatest 100 Egyptian films in 20th century or Top 100 films in the centenary of Egyptian cinema, Egyptian Arabic: قائمة أفضل مئة فيلم في مئوية السينما المصرية) is the result of a referendum in which many Egyptian critics participated in 1996 to choose the 100 best Egyptian films of the 20th century, as part of the activities of the Cairo International Film Festival in its 20th edition, on the occasion of the centenary of Egyptian cinema, which coincides with the first film screening in Egypt in 1896.

The films were selected from 1927 (where Layla was shown, the first Egyptian feature-length film) until 1996, and were announced during the celebration that was held in 1996. The referendum was supervised by the writer Saad Eddin Wahba.

Top 10 films

Full list

Record numbers
Actor Mahmoud el-Meliguy is considered the most representative on the list with 21 films in co-starring roles. As an actor and producer, Salah Zulfikar has a share of 13 films in the list, 5 of which as a producer (including 2 with acting roles) and 10 as an actor.

Representation by years
The years most represented on the list are 1962 and 1969 (5 films each), followed by 1958, 1959, 1968, 1972, 1975, 1986 (4 films each).

Sort by decade
 1960s: 28 films.
 1950s: 25 films.
 1970s: 20 films.
 1980s: 12 films.
 1940s: 7 films.
 1990s: 5 films.
 1930s: 3 films.

Sort by directors
 Youssef Chahine: 12 films.
 Salah Abu Seif: 11 films.
 Kamal El Sheikh: 8 films.
 Hussein Kamal: 6 films.
 Tewfik Saleh, Atef Salem, Mohamed Khan and Henry Barakat: 4 films each.
 Hassan al-Imam, Ezz El-Dine Zulficar, Atef El Tayeb and Said Marzouk: 3 films each.

Sort by actors
Shoukry Sarhan: is considered the highest actor with a share in the list, as 15 films were selected in which he participated in a starring role.

Male Actors
 1. Shoukry Sarhan: 15 films.
 2. Salah Zulfikar: 10 films.
3. Ahmed Zaki, Nour El-Sherif and Ahmed Mazhar: 6 films.

Female actors
 1. Faten Hamama: 9 films.
 2. Soad Hosny: 9 films.
 3. Shadia: 6 films.

See also
 Culture of Egypt
 Egyptian cinema
 Lists of Egyptian films

References

External links

Lists of Egyptian films
Egyptian
100
100 (number)